{{DISPLAYTITLE:C5H12O4}}
The molecular formula C5H12O4 (molar mass: 136.15 g/mol, exact mass: 136.0736 u) may refer to:

 Pentaerythritol
 Tetramethoxymethane